The Glass Web is a 1953 American 3-D film noir crime film directed by Jack Arnold and starring Edward G. Robinson, John Forsythe, Marcia Henderson and Kathleen Hughes.  It is based on Max Simon Ehrlich's 1952 novel Spin the Glass Web.

Plot
Henry Hayes is a well-respected crime researcher known for, and sometimes kidded, about his relentless perfectionism. Little is known of his social life. When he discovers he is being led on by gold-digger Paula Rainer, he kills her in accidental anger. He decides the best way to divert suspicion from himself is to immediately re-create the crime on his television show.

But producer Don Newell, who had been outside the dead woman's corridor at the time of the murder, notices that Hayes' perfectionism has him including items that only the murderer could have known; including which record was playing on her record player (Bing Crosby singing "Temptation").

Newell is able to trap Hayes into a confession, and Hayes is arrested.

Cast
 Edward G. Robinson as Henry Hayes
 John Forsythe as Don Newell
 Marcia Henderson as Louise Newell
 Kathleen Hughes as Paula Rainer 
 Richard Denning as Dave Markson
 Hugh Sanders as Detective Lt. Mike Stevens
 Jean Willes as Sonia
 Eve McVeagh as Viv 
 Harry Tyler as Jake (as Harry O. Tyler)
 John Hiestand as Announcer
 Clark Howat as Bob 
 Robert Nelson Plainclothesman (as Bob Nelson)
 John Verros as Fred Abbott 
 Helen Wallace as Mrs. Doyle
 Benny Rubin as Tramp Comic

Reception

Critical response
When the film was first released, The New York Times film critic Bosley Crowther gave the film a negative review, writing, "Aside from the price of silence, which seems a most original one, there is little else that is original or even startling in this film. Katherine Hughes, who plays the blonde number, makes a dainty dish of poison, it is true, but the rest, including the performances of the two gentlemen, is pretty routine. As for suspense, it is evident who did the murder all the time. And it is plain that Mr. Forsythe will not be butchered. So what goes with this sort of show?  Pardon a slightly pointed comment, but it's the kind of film you might see on TV."

References

External links
 
 
 
 

1953 films
1950s crime thriller films
1953 3D films
American 3D films
American black-and-white films
1950s English-language films
Film noir
Films directed by Jack Arnold
American crime thriller films
1950s American films